Chris Kolb (born 1958) is a politician from Ann Arbor, Michigan and a former member of the Michigan State House of Representatives.  A Democrat, Kolb represented the 53rd district, based in Ann Arbor, from January 2001 to January 2007. He was first elected in November 2000, and term limits prevented him from seeking a fourth two-year term in 2006.  Kolb was the first openly gay member of the Michigan Legislature.

Early life
Kolb graduated from Huron High School in 1976. He went on the University of Michigan, where he received a bachelor of science in natural resources before conducting graduate studies in political science at Emory University in Atlanta, Georgia.

He worked in the environmental management field for 12 years, specializing in waste management and recycling.

Political career

Prior to his tenure in the House, Kolb served eight years on the Ann Arbor City Council and was Mayor Pro-tem from 1994 through 2000. Kolb ran for mayor of Ann Arbor as the Democratic nominee in 1996 and 1998, accusing incumbent Republican mayor Ingrid Sheldon of not doing enough in the areas of environmental policy, affordable housing, and downtown vitality, but he lost both races by narrow margins.

In 2000, he ran for state representative in the 53rd district, seeking to succeed the term-limited Liz Brater. He ran unopposed in the Democratic primary and won the general election with 27,682 votes (71%) to his Republican opponent's 11,553 (29%). On his taking office, Kolb became the first ever openly gay member of the Michigan Legislature. His election campaigns have frequently won the support of the Gay & Lesbian Victory Fund.

Kolb also previously served as a Legislative Aide to State Representative John P. Hansen.

In the Michigan House, Kolb supported environmental legislation such as the Open Space Preservation Act, signed into law by Governor Jennifer Granholm. In 2002, Governor Jennifer Granholm appointed him to the Michigan Land Use Leadership Council, which would advise her on land use policy.  He also supported low tuition at state universities and attempted to add sexual orientation to the list of characteristics covered under the state's Ethnic Intimidation Act.

After the House
On leaving the House of Representatives, Kolb accepted a job with the Early Childhood Investment Corporation, a state agency charged with the education of children under the age of five. He served as Vice President for Public Affairs. He also served as executive director of Unity Michigan, a statewide coalition of LGBT advocacy groups. In December 2008, he became President of the Michigan Environmental Council, a statewide coalition of 70 environmental, public health and faith-based nonprofit groups.

Term limits prevent him from seeking a return to the State House; Michigan's term limits amendment imposes a lifetime maximum of three two-year terms as a state representative. In 2010, he declined to run for the Michigan Senate in the 18th District, a seat left open when Democratic Sen. Liz Brater was termed out.

Electoral history
2004 election for State House
Chris Kolb (D), 80%
Erik Sheagren (R), 20%
2002 election for State House
Chris Kolb (D), 78%
John Milroy (R), 22%
2000 election for State House
Chris Kolb (D), 71%
Robert Bykowski (R), 29%

References

 2004 campaign site
 Gay marriage ban fails in state House (Lansing State Journal, March 10, 2004): cites Kolb as "the only openly gay lawmaker in the Legislature".

Living people
Gay politicians
LGBT state legislators in Michigan
Politicians from Ann Arbor, Michigan
Democratic Party members of the Michigan House of Representatives
University of Michigan alumni
Emory University alumni
1958 births
20th-century American politicians
21st-century American politicians
21st-century LGBT people